Limbin (LBN) is a protein that is part of the EvC complex that consists of EvC and EvC2 genes, the activity of which is critical in bone formation and skeletal development. The complex positively regulates ciliary Hedgehog (Hh) signaling due to the ciliary localization. 

A mutation in these genes is associated with The Ellis-van Creveld (EvC) syndrome. EvC or otherwise known as Chondroestodermal dysplasia is a disorder inherited by the offspring of carriers of the mutated recessive gene and a non-mutated dominant gene leading to expression of chondrodysplasia and dwarfism. Bone growth occurs due to continuous proliferation and differentiation of chondrocytes along with endochondral ossification at both ends of a long bone. The mutations in LBN cause premature termination of encoded proteins resulting in shortening of long bones. 

Other characteristics accredited to a mutation in LBN include difficulty breathing due to shorted ribs, shortened tongue, dysplastic fingernails, and postaxial polydactyly.

References

External links